Charleston County School District is a school district within Charleston County, South Carolina, United States. It educates roughly 50,000 kindergarten to 12th grade students in 80 schools.  Charleston County School District’s (CCSD) Board of Trustees voted Monday, June 27, 2022, to name Donald R. Kennedy, Sr., the Superintendent of Schools.  Kennedy has served as CCSD’s Interim Superintendent since January 2022.  

It is the school district for the entire county.

AdvancEd Accreditation
The Charleston County School District (CCSD) and all schools are accredited by Cognia.

Superintendent
Charleston County School District’s (CCSD) Board of Trustees voted Monday, June 27, 2022, to name Donald R. Kennedy, Sr., the Superintendent of Schools.  Kennedy has served as CCSD’s Interim Superintendent since January 2022.  

Over the last six months, Kennedy has initiated and led work around Vision 2027–where all students will read on grade level by grade 5; he has also emphasized the need for root cause analysis, detailing what has prevented CCSD students, particularly those of color, from growing and achieving at high levels for decades. In addition, Kennedy has initiated training around systems thinking, acknowledging publicly that systemic change is needed in order to improve the achievement of all students.

A native of Winnsboro, South Carolina, Kennedy comes from a family of educators who emphasized the value of education and believed in the opportunities it provides. In particular, his mother, Viola Kennedy, began work as a teacher at the age of 54 after a career serving as a Food & Nutrition Services Manager in public schools.  Additionally, his wife, Pam, is a retired educator of 30+ years, with recent service at Clark Corporate Academy, and his sister is a retired teacher with 30+ years’ experience. 

Throughout his career in public service, Kennedy has supported urban education all over the country as the chief financial officer (CFO) for Baltimore City Public Schools; CFO for Boston Public Schools; Chief Operations Officer (COO) for Bridgeport Public Schools in Connecticut; as well as the Chief Financial and Operations Officer for Seattle Public Schools. He served as CCSD’s Chief Financial and Administrative Officer on two separate occasions, first from July 2004 to September 2007, and second, from January 2018 to December 2021. He also is recognized as a volunteer peer review consultant for the Council of the Great City Schools. 

A father of five, Kennedy’s passion is working collaboratively with stakeholders to ensure students have access to address all needs, including wrap-around and mental health services; rigorous, grade-level instruction; and opportunities to expand their learning beyond the classroom.  In preparation for the new school year, he has committed to focusing on restorative disciplinary practices, to ensuring that both core instruction and intervention services are a priority in all schools, to expanding Pre-K, and to aligning central office support to and for schools.  

Kennedy holds a South Carolina Superintendent certificate, a Bachelor of Science in Accounting from Newberry College, and a Master of Arts in Organizational Systems Renewal from Seattle University; he also holds a certified public accountant certificate. Prior to public service, he held corporate finance positions with Boeing and Science Applications International Corporation and served as a commissioned officer in the U.S. Air Force.  Kennedy will serve as the Superintendent until the Board of Trustees selects a replacement following a national search.

Board of Trustees

The Charleston County School Board is composed of nine local members, each elected for a 4-year term. Elections are held in November of even-numbered years. Charleston County School District's Superintendent, Donald R. Kennedy, Sr., serves as the Executive Secretary for the Board of Trustees.

Board of Trustees members are elected countywide in non-partisan elections representing constituent districts as follows: two members from Districts 1 and 2, three members from Districts 3, 9, 10 and 23; and one member from District 20. In November 2020, five seats were filled for two-year terms to join the remaining four seats. 

The Board is currently in a transition term to single-member districts which will begin with the November 2022 election. Beginning in November 2022, all nine seats will be elected from non-partisan single-member districts with a combination of four-year and two-year terms. By November 2024, all seats will serve four-year terms.

The Board meetings are held at 75 Calhoun Street, Charleston.

Human Resources
CCSD's goal is to provide prospective applicants with a wide variety of recruitment-related resources to assist them in their search for employment.

The Charleston County School District offers the most competitive teacher salary schedule in South Carolina. The Superintendent and Board have a 3-year plan to increase the salaries of ALL teachers beginning this school year. And the salary schedule for next year has already been approved for ALL teachers.

Constituent Districts
Charleston County School district was created by South Carolina Act 340 of the South Carolina General Assembly in 1967. The "Act of Consolidation" took the eight separate school districts and put them under a county-wide district to equally fund education in all areas of the county. The former independent school districts remain as constituent school districts within the structure of the Charleston County School district, with their own school boards and duties.

 St. James-Santee School District No. 1
 Moultrie School District No. 2
 James Island School District No. 3
 Cooper River School District No. 4
 St. John's School District No. 9
 St. Andrew's School District No. 10
 City of Charleston School District No. 20
 St. Paul's School District No. 23

Schools

High schools
Academic Magnet High: county-wide magnet
Baptist Hill: neighborhood (District 23)
Burke: neighborhood (District 20)
Charleston Charter School for Math and Science: charter
Clark Academy: county-wide program
Greg Mathis Charter School: charter
James Island Charter School: charter (District 3)
Liberty Hill Academy: county-wide program
Lucy Beckham High School: neighborhood (District 2)
Military Magnet Academy: county-wide magnet
North Charleston: neighborhood (District 4)
R.B. Stall: neighborhood (District 4)
St. John's: neighborhood (District 9)
School of the Arts: county-wide magnet
Wando: neighborhood (District 2, also serves District 1)
West Ashley: neighborhood (District 10)

Middle schools 
Baptist Hill: neighborhood (District 23)
Buist Academy: county-wide magnet
Burke: a neighborhood with county-wide program (District 20)
C.E. Williams: partial magnet (District 10)
Camp Road Middle School: neighborhood (District 3)
Cario: neighborhood (District 2 also serves District 1)
Charleston Charter School for Math and Science: charter
Charleston Development Academy: charter
Daniel Jenkins Creative Learning Center: county-wide program
Deer Park Middle School: neighborhood (District 4)
East Cooper Montessori Charter School: charter
Haut Gap: partial magnet (District 9)
Laing: partial magnet (District 2)
Liberty Hill Academy: county-wide program
Military Magnet Academy: county-wide magnet
Montessori Community School Program: county-wide magnet program
Morningside Middle School: neighborhood (District 4)
Moultrie: neighborhood (District 2)
Northwoods: neighborhood (District 4)
Pattison's Academy for Comprehensive Education: charter
St. Andrew's: partial magnet (District 10)
St. James-Santee: neighborhood (District 1)
Sanders-Clyde: neighborhood (District 20)
School of the Arts: county-wide magnet
West Ashley: partial magnet (District 10)
Zucker: partial magnet (District 4)

Elementary and primary schools and programs 
Angel Oak Elementary: neighborhood (District 9)
Ashley River Creative Arts Elementary: constituent district magnet (District 10)
Belle Hall Elementary: neighborhood (District 2)
Buist Academy: county-wide magnet
Carolina Park Elementary: neighborhood (District 2)
Carolina Voyager Charter: charter
Charles Pinckney Elementary: neighborhood (District 2)
Charleston Development Academy Public Charter: charter
Charleston Progressive Academy: county-wide magnet
Chicora School of Communications: neighborhood (District 4)
Corcoran Elementary: neighborhood (District 4)
Drayton Hall Elementary: neighborhood (District 20)
Dunston Primary: neighborhood (District 4)
East Cooper Montessori Charter School: charter
Ellington Elementary: neighborhood (District 23)
Frierson Elementary: neighborhood (District 9)
Goodwin Elementary: neighborhood (District 4)
Harbor View Elementary: neighborhood (District 3)
Hunley Park Elementary: neighborhood (District 4)
Hursey Elementary: partial magnet (District 4)
James B. Edwards Elementary: neighborhood (District 2)
James Island Elementary: neighborhood (District 3)
James Simmons Elementary: neighborhood (District 23)
Jane Edwards Elementary: neighborhood (District 23)
Jennie Moore Elementary: partial magnet (District 2)
Ladson Elementary: neighborhood (District 4)
Lambs Elementary: neighborhood (District 4)
Laurel Hill Primary: neighborhood (District 2)
Mary Ford Early Learning and Family Development Center: neighborhood (District 4)
Meeting Street Elementary at Brentwood: neighborhood (District 4)
Memminger School of Global Studies: partial magnet (District 20)
Midland Park Primary: neighborhood (District 4)
Minnie Hughes: neighborhood (District 23)
Mitchell Math and Science: partial magnet (District 20)
Montessori Community School Program: county-wide magnet program
Mt. Pleasant Academy: neighborhood (District 2)
Mt. Zion: neighborhood (District 2)
Murray-LaSaine Elementary: neighborhood (District 3)
North Charleston Creative Arts Elementary: partial magnet (District 4)
North Charleston Elementary: neighborhood (District 4)
Oakland Elementary: neighborhood (District 10)
Pattison's Academy for Comprehensive Education: charter
Pepperhill Elementary: neighborhood (District 4)
Pinehurst Elementary: neighborhood (District 4)
Sanders-Clyde Elementary: neighborhood (District 20)
St. Andrews School of Math and Science: partial magnet (District 10)
St. James-Santee Elementary: neighborhood (District 1)
Springfield Elementary: neighborhood (District 10)
Stiles Point Elementary: neighborhood (District 3)
Stono Park Elementary: neighborhood (District 10)
Sullivans Island Elementary: neighborhood (District 2)
Whitesides Elementary: neighborhood (District 2)

See also
List of schools in Charleston, South Carolina
Septima Poinsette Clark

References

External links
Charleston County School District homepage

School districts in South Carolina
Education in Charleston County, South Carolina